My Life as McDull (Chinese: 麥兜故事) is a 2001 Hong Kong animated feature film. The film surrounds the life of McDull, a hugely popular cartoon pig character created by Alice Mak and Brian Tse which has appeared on comics ever since the 1990s. In 2004, the sequel to this film, McDull, Prince de la Bun, was released.

Awards
The FIPRESCI prize at the 26th Hong Kong International Film Festival (2002)

Grand Prix at the Annecy International Animated Film Festival, Annecy, France (2003)

Synopsis

McDull is not the brightest kid, but he continually tries his best to please his mother. Although it seems that he may not be destined for great things in life as his mother wishes, McDull never gives up.

The story focuses on several tales about McDull and his childhood. This is told as a narrative reflection of a now adult McDull. These tales muddle up in imaginative uses of Cantonese and heaps of local Hong Kong culture. From tales about a turkey dinner to dreams of following in Ye Zhicheng's footsteps, McDull faces ebbs and flows with his demanding but devoted mother. In a part of the film, McDull decides to train to be an Olympic-level athlete like the Hong Kong Olympian Ye Zhicheng. However, the trade he learns is Cheung Chau bun-snatching. Realising that bun-snatching is not a formal sporting event in the Olympic games, McDull's mother writes a letter to the chairman of the International Olympic Committee (IOC), asking him/her with her limited proficiency of English to sanctify the so-called sport event.

There is a significant amount of material in the movie which is culturally relevant to Hong Kong. For example, a large proportion of the humour and appeal of the movie arises from its complex wordplay and subtle hints of Hong Kong's historical legacy and dynamic.

The songs featured in the film are bright and beguiling, and are not overbearing as some musical animations are likely to become. The film's animation is trouble-free and colourful changing at times as stories alter, but echoing the fashion of the innovative artwork. It uses a number of contemporary Computer Graphics animations in several scenes to illustrate an urban Hong Kong, but it skillfully shows Hong Kong as the dirty conurbation it is rather than the high-pitched clean cityscape that many travel advertisements like to portray.

The genial and timid piglet McDull has cheered up the lives of kids, professors, housewives and CEOs, because he epitomises the uncontainable and happy-go-lucky spirit of Hong Kong. His no-holds-barred porcobiography is a frame-by-frame account of life growing up in the slums of Kung Pui Chi, set against the colourful campaign of a post-97 Hong Kong trudging along regardless of downturn woes. Pouncing shots of busy 6A streets, slimy cafés, plus sights and smells of local flavour fused with animation, live object shooting and 3-D computer graphics define the film.

See also
Hong Kong–Maldives relations

External links

2001 films
2000s Cantonese-language films
Hong Kong animated films
Films based on comic strips
Television shows based on comic strips
Yellow Bus
Chinese children's films
2001 animated films
McDull
Annecy Cristal for a Feature Film winners
2000s Hong Kong films